The Foostock, also known as the Ruchen, is a mountain of the Glarus Alps, located on the border between the Swiss cantons of Glarus and St. Gallen. It lies north of Piz Sardona, on the range that separates the Sernftal from the Weisstannental.

The Foostock lies between two passes that carry hiking trails between the cantons of St. Gallen and Glarus. The Foo Pass lies to the south of the Foostock and carries a trail from Weisstannen in St. Gallen to Elm in Glarus, forming part of the Alpine Pass Route between Sargans to Montreux. The less well known Riseten Pass lies to the north of the Foostock and links Weisstannen with Matt in Glarus.

References

External links
 Foostock on Hikr

Mountains of the Alps
Mountains of Switzerland
Mountains of the canton of St. Gallen
Mountains of the canton of Glarus
Glarus–St. Gallen border
Two-thousanders of Switzerland